Polymatheia (Ancient Greek: Πολυμάθεια) in Greek mythology was one of the three Muses recognized at Sicyon, as remarked by Plutarch. Her name literally means "much knowledge, erudition", and Plutarch compares her to Polymnia to whom he ascribes precedence over accumulation and preservation of knowledge.

Note

References 

 Lucius Mestrius Plutarchus, Moralia with an English Translation by Frank Cole Babbitt. Cambridge, MA. Harvard University Press. London. William Heinemann Ltd. 1936. Online version at the Perseus Digital Library. Greek text available from the same website.

See also
 List of Greek mythological figures
 Polymath

Greek goddesses